UFO are an English hard rock band from London. Formed in 1969 under the name Hocus Pocus, the group originally consisted of vocalist Phil Mogg, guitarist Mick Bolton, bassist Pete Way and drummer Andy Parker. The current lineup of the band includes original members Mogg and Parker, plus lead guitarist Vinnie Moore (since 2003), bassist Rob De Luca (since 2008), and keyboardist and rhythm guitarist Neil Carter (from 1980 to 1983 and since 2019).

History

1969–1983
UFO were formed in October 1969 by Phil Mogg, Mick Bolton, Pete Way and Andy Parker. Bolton left in early 1972, shortly after the release of the band's first live album Live. He was briefly replaced by Larry Wallis, who was later fired by Mogg and replaced in November by Bernie Marsden. In June 1973, Scorpions guitarist Michael Schenker substituted for Marsden on a German tour, and later joined as a full member. Paul Chapman was added as a second guitarist following the release of Phenomenon in 1974, although he would leave the following January after failing to turn up for a show. Danny Peyronel was added as the band's first keyboardist in 1975, featuring on their fifth album No Heavy Petting.

In July 1976, Peyronel was replaced by Savoy Brown's Paul Raymond, who also contributed rhythm guitar to the band. Due to increased problems stemming from his alcohol abuse, Schenker quit UFO after a show in October 1978, with Chapman returning to take his place shortly after. Raymond left two years later and was briefly replaced by John Sloman, before Neil Carter took his place midway through the recording of The Wild, the Willing and the Innocent. Way left UFO after the release of 1982's Mechanix, with Chapman and Carter recording bass for Making Contact. Billy Sheehan was brought in to perform on a European tour in early 1983, with Paul Gray taking over from late February until the end of the tour in April. Upon the conclusion of the tour, UFO decided to disband.

1984–1998
Mogg reformed UFO in late 1984 with returning bassist Gray, new guitarist "Atomik" Tommy McClendon and new drummer Robbie France. By early 1985, France had been replaced by Jim Simpson and former keyboardist Paul Raymond had returned to the band, with the five-piece releasing Misdemeanor later in the year. Raymond left the band in July 1986 and was replaced by David Jacobson for the rest of the year's touring cycle. McClendon was replaced by Myke Gray in late 1987, and in early 1988 original members Pete Way and Andy Parker returned to the group. A new lineup of the band including guitarist Rik Sanford and drummer Fabio Del Rio began working on a new album later in the year, and after brief stints with Tony Glidewell and Erik Gamans on guitar, UFO broke up for a second time in 1989.

UFO returned for a third time in 1991, with Mogg and Way joined by guitarist Laurence Archer, drummer Clive Edwards and, later, keyboardist Jem Davis. In 1993, Schenker, Parker and Raymond returned to reunite the 'classic' lineup of the band, releasing the album Walk on Water in 1995. Simon Wright replaced Parker in 1995. Schenker left to promote his debut solo album Thank You in 1995, returning in 1997 to support the European release of Walk on Water. The guitarist quit suddenly after a show on April 24, 1998, with Wright and Raymond following soon after; due to an agreement signed by the band members, Mogg and Way were unable to use the name UFO without Schenker, and briefly considered renaming the group Lights Out. However, the pair continued collaborating under the moniker Mogg/Way.

2000 onwards
After a two-year hiatus, UFO returned again in 2000 with Schenker returning and Aynsley Dunbar added on drums, releasing Covenant in July. For the album's promotional tour, Luis Maldonado (keyboards, rhythm guitar) and Jeff Martin (drums) were added to the band's lineup. Dunbar returned in 2002 to perform on Sharks, which was the band's last album to feature Schenker who quit in January 2003, relinquishing his part-ownership of the name in order that UFO could continue. In July, it was announced that Vinnie Moore would replace Schenker, Jason Bonham would replace Dunbar, and Paul Raymond would return to the band. Bonham remained in UFO until 2005, when Parker returned to the group, and in 2008 Rob De Luca joined in place of Way, after filling in for him on an initially temporary basis.

On 13 April 2019, Paul Raymond died of a heart attack just a few days after the end of a tour. Two weeks later, it was announced that Neil Carter had rejoined the band to take Raymond's place on tour.

Members

Current

Former

Touring

Timeline

Recording Timeline

Lineups

Bibliography

References

External links
UFO official website

UFO